Aldisa andersoni is a species of sea slug, a dorid nudibranch, a marine gastropod mollusk in the family Cadlinidae.

Distribution 
This species was described from Pigeon Island, Trincomalee, Sri Lanka. It has subsequently been reported from the Muttom coast, India, and Mirissa, Southern Province, Sri Lanka.

Ecology
Aldisa andersoni has been found to contain Phorbazole metabolites which are probably derived from its food, a sponge in the family Hymedesmiidae.

References

Cadlinidae
Gastropods described in 2004